I Am is the ninth studio album by the American band Earth, Wind & Fire released in June 1979 on ARC/Columbia Records. The LP rose to number 1 on the Billboard Top Soul Albums chart and number 3 on the Billboard 200 chart. I Am has been certified Double Platinum in the U.S. by the RIAA, Platinum in the UK by the BPI and Platinum in Canada by Music Canada.

Overview
I Am was produced by Maurice White. Artists such as The Emotions and Toto's Steve Lukather also made guest appearances on the album.

Singles
The song "After the Love Has Gone", reached number 2 on both the Billboard Hot 100 and Hot Soul Songs charts. After The Love Has Gone also reached number 3 on both the Billboard Adult Contemporary Songs and UK Pop Singles charts. The ballad was Grammy nominated in the category of Record of the Year. After the Love Has Gone also won a Grammy for Best R&B Vocal Performance by a Duo or Group.

Another single, "Boogie Wonderland" featuring The Emotions, reached number 2 on the Billboard Hot Soul Songs chart and number 6 on the Billboard Hot 100 chart. Boogie Wonderland was also Grammy nominated in the categories of Best Disco Recording and Best R&B Instrumental Performance.

Critical reception

Eric Sieger of the Baltimore Sun described I Am as "faultlessly produced". Sieger added "The album features a horn and string section, synthesizers, congas and kalimbas and the material ranges from straight boogie to soulful ballads. Lyrically, some of the numbers leave something to be desired, but Earth, Wind & Fire is one group where the musicianship is so sharp and vibrant that the words don't seem to matter quite so much." Phyl Garland of Stereo Review said "As Earth, Wind & Fire have strengthened their grip on success, the mystical and extraterrestrial emblems adorning their albums have gained proportionately in grandiosity. This latest one, with a title echoing the majesty of Jehovah and an inside cover featuring a portrait of the group costumed and posed as
princes out of fable, is no exception. Such bombast may be considered forgivable in this case, however, because of the excellence of the music on the record.
As usual, this astral outfit blasts off in a balls -of -fire flurry of rhythm, which is cleverly varied through the album, even within selections, without losing its driving thrust. There is some evidence of capitulation to disco, particularly on Boogie Wonderland, to which the Emotions lend a few spirited soprano embellishments, but the emphasis throughout is on a dazzling interplay between
precision ensemble voices-employed like horns-in rapid, robust exchanges with the group's instruments augmented by a large orchestra."  Rose Riggins of Gannett exclaimed "I Am is explosive and ready to lift you off your feet to boogie wonderland. Earth Wind & Fire's 10th album, it shows the band is still on the move upward. This is a fine LP, both versatile and creative." Dave Marsh of Rolling Stone exclaimed " I Am is obviously meant to portend something, but who knows what? Is this Maurice White’s vision of paradise?" John Rockwell of The New York Times stated "This flashily theatrical, musically imaginative creation of Maurice White can almost always be counted on for interesting records, and the new 'I Am' album is no exception." Rockwell added "Mr. White's records reaffirm one of the basic truths about the shifting fashions of black music. All these up‐tempo Idioms are inherently related. Disco and funk and soul and rhythm and blues are all fruits of the same tree —the music of rural black people, growing from African roots and shaped by influences from the dominant white culture, evangelical Christianity and the ‘urban experience. A band like Earth, Wind and Fire will enjoy its disco hits. But those hits won't sound like a very significant change in direction because a slight emphasis of the bass line entails only the most modest modification of the basic style." Allen Weiner of Morning Call stated "EW&F's latest effort goes beyond every level of achievement Maurice White's legions have yet attempted. "I Am" is a splendid example of EW&F's ability to create soul with individuality and without cliches, music that is both artistic and commercial." Robert Christgau of the Village Voice wrote "Sexy, dancey pop music of undeniable craft, and it doesn't let up. But as we all know, they could be doing a lot better." Connie Johnson of The Los Angeles Times proclaimed "I Am is freshly innovative for EW&F in that it emphasizes the one-on-one as opposed to the cosmic experience, and freely utilizes the skill of other writers to propel that message. The album should also enforce EW&F's image as trend-setters for other rhythm & blues groups seeking to escape the traditional, doo-wop mold." Robot A. Hull of Creem described the LP as "a rhythmic utopia". Ace Adams of the New York Daily News called the album "A collection of numbers from disco to rhythm and blues and into a little jazz." Adams added "The group's impressive vocals make this album a must".

NME placed I Am at number 16 on their albums of the year list for 1979. Melody Maker also placed the album at number 8 on their albums of the year list for 1979. Bandleader Maurice White was also Grammy nominated in the category of Producer of the Year Non-Classical.

Track listing

Original release

2004 reissue bonus tracks

Note
The Emotions are Jeanette Hawes, Sheila Hutchinson-Whitt & Wanda Hutchinson-Vaughn

Uses in other media
"Let Your Feelings Show" was featured in an episode of the TV series Fame called "Heritage". This song was later sampled in Kid Ink's song "The Movement", from his 2014 album My Own Lane.

Personnel
 Junior Wells (additional on 11), Philip Bailey, Maurice White - lead vocals
 The Emotions (additional on 5), Philip Bailey, Maurice White - backing vocals
 Verdine White - bass
 Daniel Smith, Delores Bing, Jacqueline Lustgarten, Jan Kelley, John Walz, Kevan Torfeh, Larry Corbett, Miguel Martinez - cello
 Philip Bailey - congas
 Fred White, Maurice White - drums
 Barbara Korn, Sidney Muldrow, Richard Perissi, Marilyn Robinson - French horn
 Johnny Graham (1-9, 11), Marlo Henderson, Steve Lukather, Al McKay - guitar
 Junior Wells (11) - harmonica
 Sir Alexander Dutkewych (12), Dorothy Ashby - harp
 Maurice White - kalimba
 David Foster, Eduardo del Barrio, Bill Meyers - keyboards
 Philip Bailey, Paulinho Da Costa, Ralph Johnson - percussion
 Larry Dunn - piano, Oberheim, Moog synthesizers 
 Steve Porcaro - synthesizer programming
 Don Myrick - alto and baritone saxophone
 Andrew Woolfolk, Don Myrick - tenor saxophone
 Don Myrick (3) - saxophone solo
 Fred Jackson, Jr., Herman Riley, Jerome Richardson - additional saxophone
 Richard Lepore - timpani
 George Bohanon, Garnett Brown, Bill Reichenbach Jr., Louis Satterfield, Benjamin Powell, Maurice Spears - trombone
 Rahmlee Michael Davis (6) - trumpet solo
 Oscar Brashear, Bobby Bryant, Michael Harris, Jerry Hey, Elmer Brown, Rahmlee Michael Davis, Steve Madaio - trumpet
 James Ross, Laurie Woods, Linda Lipsett, Marilyn Baker, Rollice Dale, Virginia Majewski - viola
 Anton Sen, Sherman Bryana, Carl LaMagna, Cynthia Kovaks, Gina Kronstadt, Haim Shtrum, Harris Goldman, Henry Ferber, Henry Roth, Ilkka Talvi, Jack Gootkin, Jerome Reisler, Jerome Webster, Joseph Goodman, Joseph Livoti, Judith Talvi, Leeana Sherman, Marcy Dicterow, Pamela Gates, Pavel Farkas, Ronald Clarck, Rosmen Torfeh, Sheldon Sanov, William Henderson - violin

Production
Design by Roger Carpenter
Illustration by Shusei Nagaoka
Mastered by Michael Reese
Producer - Maurice White (Original, Reissue), Leo Sacks (Reissue), Paul Klingberg (additional on 10, 12)
Engineer - Tom Perry, George Massenburg
Assistant Engineers - Craig Widby, Ross Pallone
Mixing - Mark Wilder (11), George Massenburg
Concertmaster - Janice Gower
Horn Arrangements - Jerry Hey (1, 3, 7-8, 10-12), Tom Tom 84 (2, 4, 6-7, 9), Benjamin F. Wright (5)
String Arrangements - David Foster (1, 3, 8, 10), Tom Tom 84 (2, 4, 6-7, 9), Benjamin F. Wright (5)

Charts and certifications

Charts

Albums

Year-end charts

Singles

Certifications

Accolades
The information regarding accolades attributed to I Am is adapted from Acclaimed Music and NME

See also
List of number-one R&B albums of 1979 (U.S.)

References

1979 albums
Albums produced by Maurice White
Earth, Wind & Fire albums
Columbia Records albums
CBS Records albums
ARC Records albums
Albums with cover art by Shusei Nagaoka